Channel 16 VHF (156.8 MHz) is a marine VHF radio frequency designated as an international distress frequency. Primarily intended for distress, urgency and safety priority calls, the frequency may also carry routine calls used to establish communication before switching to another working channel.

Authorized usage 
The International Telecommunication Union (ITU) has established VHF channel 16 (156.8 MHz) as a distress, safety and calling channel, and it is monitored 24 hours a day by many coast guards around the world.

Radio watchkeeping regulations advise all sea bound vessels to monitor channel 16 VHF when sailing, except when communicating on other marine channels for legitimate business or operational reasons. Coast guards and others are permitted to broadcast short informative safety messages on channel 16; however, it is an offence in most countries to make false mayday calls. When using the channel to call up ships or shore stations, the call has to be switched to a working channel after the initial response in order to keep channel 16 available to others.

See also
Mayday
Pan-pan
2,182 kHz
Filipino Monkey

References 

Distress signals
Emergency communication
International telecommunications
Maritime communication
Rescue